Mère-Bi is a 2008 documentary film about Annette Mbaye d'Erneville by her son, director Ousmane William Mbaye. The first Senegalese female journalist, she was deeply involved in the development of her country. Both an activist and a non-conformist, she fought for the emancipation of women from the beginning. She divided her life between France, where she studied, and Senegal, where she returned in 1957, sensing that independence was on its way.

References

External links
Watch Mere-bi Mother at Culture Unplugged.com

2008 films
Senegalese documentary films
2008 documentary films
Documentary films about feminism
Documentary films about women writers
Documentary films about journalists
2000s French-language films
Documentary films about African politics